Spring and Port Wine is a stage play by Bill Naughton and a 1970 British kitchen sink drama film based on it. The drama is set in Bolton and concerns the Crompton family, especially Rafe, the father, and his attempts to assert his authority in the household as his children grow up.

Stage version
The original version, My Flesh, My Blood, was a BBC radio play broadcast on 17 August 1957 in the Saturday Night Theatre series. By April 1958, a version for BBC Television had been broadcast and, in October 1959, a stage adaptation was presented at the Bolton Hippodrome.

Retitled Spring and Port Wine, the play was first produced in Birmingham prior to opening at London's Mermaid Theatre in November 1965, with Alfred Marks (as Rafe), Ruth Dunning (as Daisy), John Alderton (as Harold), Jennifer Wilson (as Florence), Jan Carey (as Hilda), Ray Mort (as Arthur), Gretchen Franklin (as Betsy Jane) and Melvyn Hayes (as Wilfred) in the cast. It was produced by Allan Davis and Michael Medwin, in association with the Mermaid Theatre Trust; Davis was also the director. In January 1966, the production transferred to the Apollo Theatre in the West End, subsequently moving to the New Theatre in July 1967 and then St Martin's Theatre in June 1968. It achieved a West End run of 1,236 performances. Alfred Marks, meanwhile, had left the cast and from 1967–68 played the lead role of Rafe in an Australian tour.

The play was adapted (by N. Richard Nash, who was uncredited) to a setting in the United States under the title Keep It in the Family, which ran on Broadway at the Plymouth Theatre for five performances in September 1967. The play was profiled in the William Goldman book The Season: A Candid Look at Broadway.

Film adaptation

Plot

The following synopsis and cast are taken from the film. The play's plot is very similar.

Rafe Crompton (James Mason) works in a weaving mill. He is a proud man but not a rich man. He lives in a garden city style council house beyond the standard brick terraces of the town. At the end of the week he gathers the various wages from his children and passes it to his wife, Daisy (Diana Coupland) who with Florence the eldest daughter (Hannah Gordon) keeps the family budget in order, making allowances for lending neighbours cash for emergencies such as the repossession of their hire purchase TV.

The younger daughter Hilda (Susan George) is seen as being a bit aloof and she refuses to eat the herring which has been prepared for "tea". Her father determines to serve it to her every day until she eats it.

The sons Harold and Wilfred (Rodney Bewes and Len Jones) are shocked when a box is delivered containing a fine overcoat together with a receipt for 40 guineas.

Mr Crompton likes the family to stand around the piano and sing hymns.

The herring issue comes to a head when the herring disappears. It is found outside being eaten by the cat. However, Mr Crompton does not believe the herring was taken by the cat. He makes Wilfred swear on the bible that he did not move the herring. Wilfred faints under the pressure. This precipitates both daughters to leave. Florence goes to live with her fiancé Arthur. Hilda goes to stay with the neighbours, the Duckworths. However, this proves to be a step down rather than up.

Mr Duckworth (Frank Windsor) sits around in a filthy vest making demands on his long-suffering wife (Avril Elgar) while his daughter (Adrienne Posta) eats a banana wrapped in bread. Moreover it appears that Hilda is pregnant. Her mum pawns the new overcoat to give money to help her. The neighbour Mrs Duckworth also shows her how to break into the bureau to get at the cash box. From this the family starts to crumble when Mr Crompton discovers the losses.

Mrs Crompton runs off in the rain. Rafe finds her under a bridge, staring into the canal, possibly considering suicide. He says he doesn't care about the coat or the money.

Meanwhile the boys pack and prepare to also leave.

As Mr and Mrs Compton walk home everything is resolved. He even considers that Hilda refused to eat her herring as she is pregnant, comparing her to when his wife was pregnant. Rafe also says that he will give Hilda his love and protection if she is pregnant. At home he confesses he has always known of her trickery with the housekeeping money but as a sign of trust gives her the key to the bureau and cashbox. Florence is persuaded to stay home until she marries. They also know Hilda is pregnant but ask her to also stay. She accepts. The boys are free to leave but choose not to.

The film ends with Mr Crompton playing the piano and Hilda singing a hymn while the rest of the family gather round on the chairs in the living room. They are all reunited again.

Cast

 James Mason as Rafe Crompton
 Diana Coupland as Daisy Crompton
 Susan George as Hilda Crompton
 Rodney Bewes as Harold Crompton
 Hannah Gordon as Florence Crompton
 Len Jones as Wilfred Crompton
 Keith Buckley as Arthur Gasket
 Avril Elgar as Betsy-Jane Duckworth
 Adrienne Posta as Betty Duckworth
 Frank Windsor as Ned Duckworth
 Arthur Lowe as Mr. Aspinall
 Marjorie Rhodes as Mrs. Gasket
 Bernard Bresslaw as Lorry Driver
 Joseph Greig as Allan (TV man)
 Christopher Timothy as Joe (TV man)
 Ken Parry as Pawnbroker
 Reg Green, Jack Howarth, Bryan Pringle and John Sharp as Bowlers
 Bernard Smidowicz as Van Driver

Production

Filming
The external shots were shot in Bolton in 1969 and the family house is 51 Grisdale Road.

It was filmed whilst many of the old industrial buildings remained and as St. Peters Way was being constructed, and the film includes panoramic shots of an early stage of work on that part of the new road adjacent to St Peter's Church, where it follows the former course of the River Croal and the Bolton arm of the Manchester Bolton & Bury Canal.

The movie was the first film shot at Elstree Studios after Bryan Forbes took over. Two-thirds of the budget was provided by Anglo-EMI, Nat Cohen's subsidiary of EMI Films.

Radio versions
After the film version, Naughton's play returned to its radio roots no fewer than three times, featuring in the BBC's Afternoon Theatre strand in August 1975, July 1979 and July 1982.

References

External links
 
 
 Spring & Port Wine Fan Page on 4:3tv - The Retro Forum

1970 films
1970 drama films
British drama films
British films based on plays
Films shot in Greater Manchester
Films set in Lancashire
Films scored by Douglas Gamley
Plays by Bill Naughton
Bolton
1970s English-language films
1970s British films